Carex williamsii is a species of sedge found in Siberia and northern North America, from Alaska to Greenland.

References

williamsii
Plants described in 1901